Per Zanussi (born 1977) is an Italian–Norwegian jazz musician (upright bass) and composer, known from several bands and releases such as with Hamid Drake, Louis Moholo, Paal Nilssen-Love, Bobby Bradford, Sabir Mateen, Franklin Kiermyer, Stephen O'Malley, Axel Dörner, Petter Wettre, Fred Lonberg-Holm, Bugge Wesseltoft, Mats Gustafsson, Kjetil Møster, Kevin Norton, Ivar Grydeland, Ernesto Rodrigues, Tetuzi Akiyama, and Håvard Wiik.

Career 
Zanussi was born in Oslo and was educated on the Jazz program at Trondheim Musikkonservatorium and at Norges Musikkhøgskole. He was one of the initiators of the band Wibutee from Trondheim (1996–2004), with Håkon Kornstad and Wetle Holte.

Since 2001 he has led the "Zanussi Five" with saxophone lineup Kjetil Møster, Rolf-Erik Nystrøm and Eirik Hegdal, and percussionist Per Oddvar Johansen, a project that has produced three albums. He also contributes to the "MZN3" with Kjetil Møster and Kjell Nordeson, the "Trespass Trio" with Martin Kuchen and Raymond Strid, the Jazzmob and the "Crimetime Orchestra".

Discography

Solo albums 
With Zanussi Five
 2004: Zanussi Five (Moserobie Prod)
 2007: Alborado (Moserobie Prod)
 2010: Ghost Dance (Moserobie Prod)
 2014: Live in Coimbra (Clean Feed)

With Trondheim Jazz Orchestra
 2011: Morning Songs (MNJ)

Collaborations 
With Wunderkammer
 1999: Wunderkammer (Plateselskapet Skarv)
 2002: Today I Cannot Hear Music (HoneyMilk)

With Petter Wettre
 2002: Household Name (Household)
 2004: Hallmark Moments (Household)

With Wibutee
 2004: Playmachine (Jazzland)

With Frode Gjerstad
 2005: Born to Collapse (Circulasione Totale), including Anders Hana and Morten Olsen

With the trio 'MZN3' including Kjetil Møster and Kjell Nordeson
 2005: MZN3 (Jazzaway)

With Jazzmob
 2005: Infernal Machine (Jazzaway)
 2006: Flashback (Jazzaway), from Moldejazz

With Jon Eberson Trio
 2006: Bring It On (Jazzaway)

With Martin Küchen Trio
 2007: Live at Glenn Miller Café (Ayler)

With Trespass Trio
 2009: ...Was There to Illuminate the Sight Sky... (Clean Feed)
 2012: Bruder Beda (Clean Feed)
 2013: Human Encore (Clean Feed), including with Joe McPhee

With Marilyn Crispell
 2009: Collaborations (Leo)

With Circulasione Totale Orchestra
 2009: Bandwidth (Rune Grammofon)
 2011: PhilaOslo (Circulasione Totale)

With Crimetime Orchestra
 2009: Atomic Symphony (Jazzaway), featuring Sonny Simmons and KORK

With Jørn Øien Trio
 2010: Digging in the Dark (Bolage)

With S/S Motsol
 2011: Parallel Pleasures (Creative Sources)

With Mette Henriette
 2015: Mette Henriette (ECM)

References

External links

1977 births
Living people
Norwegian University of Science and Technology alumni
Musicians from Oslo
Norwegian jazz composers
Norwegian jazz upright-bassists
Male double-bassists
Jazz double-bassists
Household Records artists
21st-century double-bassists
21st-century Norwegian male musicians
Petter Wettre Quartet members
Trondheim Jazz Orchestra members
Wibutee members